Xuecheng (born 3 October 1966) is a Chinese Buddhist monk, a former member of the National Committee of the Chinese People's Political Consultative Conference, and a popular blogger. He was president of the Buddhist Association of China from 2015 to 2018 when he resigned after allegations that he had engaged in corruption and sexual assault surfaced. He was ordered to be punished by the National Religious Affairs Administration after they corroborated the allegations.

Biography

Early life
Xuecheng was born as Fu Ruilin, the eldest of three sons on October 3, 1966 to a family of strong Buddhist culture in Luofeng village of Laidian Town, Xianyou County, Fujian Province. His grandmother was a Buddhist practitioner and later became a nun. His mother was a devoted Buddhist in addition. His father worked as an accountant and office clerk in the village. Influenced by his mother and grandmother, at age 10, Xuecheng voluntarily became a vegetarian, and began to chant Buddhist scriptures at age of 12.

Training
In 1982, at the age of 16, Master Xuecheng started his monastic life and received teachings from masters such as Ven. Master Dinghai, and Most Ven. Yuanzhuo. He graduated from the Buddhist Academy of China in 1991 with a master's degree.

Life as abbot 
Xuecheng served as abbot of Guanghua Temple (Putian), Famen Temple (Fufeng, Shaanxi), and Beijing Longquan Monastery. In 2007, he was elected secretary general of the Buddhist Association of China, taking over the presidency of this organisation in 2015. He was the youngest monastic ever to ascend to the position.

Sexual misconduct accusations 
In 2018, monks who had formerly worked for Xuecheng published a 95-page report which included allegations sexual harassment of several nuns, embezzlement of funds, dictatorial management style, illegal construction, and corruption among other things. He resigned as the head of China's Buddhist association after the allegations were published. According to the South China Morning Post, the report was written by two of the monastery's former monks and posted on social media. The report alleged that the abbot "sent suggestive messages to two female monks at Longquan Temple and made unwanted sexual advances towards at least four others." Other chapters of the report outlined how he had overseen the illegal construction of several buildings at the monastery and embezzled funds. "Longquan temple is under his spell ... Xuecheng manipulated disciples to serve his 'Buddhist empire,'" the report stated. One of the report's authors, Monk Xianqi, told that they didn't intend to make it public and didn't know how it leaked, but from CCN news, he has reported to CNN in July already. The monks had submitted the report to the police. The other authors said on social media that he was compelled to speak out after the victims were ignored by authorities who said they could not investigate the matter. The incident has been characterized as a part of the Chinese me too movement.

In August 2018, the National Religious Affairs Administration (NRAA) announced that its investigators had completed their investigation into the allegations against Xuecheng. The investigation corroborated many of the allegations made against Xuecheng and the NRAA ordered the Buddhist Association of China to severely punish him. A police investigation into the sexual assault allegations is ongoing.

Publications

Academic collection: 
 Faith and Dialogues, 
 Harmony and Vision, 
 Responsibility and Commitment, 

Dharma talks collections: 
 All Afflictions, Our Own Choices, 
 Let It Go: Losing is Gaining, 
 Understanding Life, 
 The Path of Refuge, 

Blog collection:
 Ven. Master Xuecheng's Blog: Essay Collections (Vol. I—VII), 
 Xuecheng's Blog: Message Collections (Vol. I—VII), 

Dharma talks by video:
 Understanding Life
 A Life of Suffering and Happiness
 Knowing Life
 Breakfast Talks
 The Path of Refuge
 The Path to Enlightenment
 Lamrim Chenmo: Vipashyana
 The Inner World: Lecture on the Treatise on the Illumination Door of the One Hundred Dharmas

References

External links
 Biography of Xuecheng on the website of the Buddhist Academy of China
 

1966 births
Living people
21st-century Chinese criminals
Chan Buddhist monks
Chinese Buddhist monks
Chinese Buddhists
Chinese male criminals
Members of the National Committee of the Chinese People's Political Consultative Conference
People from Putian
People's Republic of China Buddhist monks
People's Republic of China Buddhists
People's Republic of China politicians from Fujian
Violence against women in China
Religious leaders in China